Gouy-en-Artois (literally "Gouy in Artois") is a commune in the Pas-de-Calais department in the Hauts-de-France region of France.

Geography

Population

Places of interest
 The church of St. Armand, dating from the eighteenth century.
 A seventeenth century farmhouse..
 The Commonwealth War Graves Commission cemetery.

See also
Communes of the Pas-de-Calais department

References

External links

 The CWGC cemetery

Gouyenartois